Seehofer is a surname. Notable people with the surname include:

 Emma Seehofer (before 1854–1912), German operatic contralto
 Horst Seehofer (born 1949), German politician
 Karin Seehofer (born 1958), second wife of Horst

German-language surnames
German toponymic surnames

de:Seehofer